Anthony Warren Shumaker (born 14 May 1973) is a former Major League Baseball pitcher. He was born in Tucson, Arizona.

Shumaker played baseball while attending college at Cardinal Stritch University. He was drafted in the 23rd round of the 1995 Major League Baseball Draft by the Philadelphia Phillies. He played at the Major League level with the team in 1999. The following year, he was selected off waivers by the New York Mets and was later traded to the Baltimore Orioles for minor league player Juan Aracena. He would also be a member of the Chicago Cubs organization.

References

Philadelphia Phillies players
Major League Baseball pitchers
Cardinal Stritch Wolves baseball players
1973 births
Living people
Baseball players from Tucson, Arizona
Atlantic City Surf players
Newark Bears players
Long Island Ducks players
Batavia Clippers players
Clearwater Phillies players
Piedmont Boll Weevils players
Reading Phillies players
Rochester Red Wings players
Scranton/Wilkes-Barre Red Barons players